Automotora VIP is a diesel-electric railbus currently used for catenary maintenance by Infraestruturas de Portugal. It was created as a railbus for VIP services in 1992 by refurbishing CP 0301 at CP's Figueira da Foz workshops.

References

Diesel multiple units of Portugal